The East Midlands Counties Football League was an English football league that operated from 2008 to 2021, covering the counties of Derbyshire, Leicestershire and Nottinghamshire in the East Midlands. The league had one division, which stood at the tenth level of the football pyramid.

History
The league was formed in 2008, drawing clubs from the Northern Counties East League (2), Central Midlands League (8) and Leicestershire Senior League (8) to create a division at level 10 of the English football league system.

On 15 May 2008 The FA Leagues Committee placed the new league at Step 6 in the National League System. Eighteen clubs were invited to form the new league;
From the Central Midlands League: Blackwell Miners Welfare, Dunkirk, Gedling Miners Welfare, Graham Street Prims, Greenwood Meadows, Heanor Town, Holbrook Miners Welfare, Radford;
From the Leicestershire Senior League: Bardon Hill, Barrow Town, Ellistown, Hinckley Downes, Holwell Sports, Ibstock United, Kirby Muxloe SC, St. Andrews;
From the Northern Counties East League: Borrowash Victoria, Gedling Town

The league provided a pathway for successful clubs to higher grade football, with clubs moving up to the Midland League Premier Division, Northern Counties East League Premier Division and United Counties League Premier Division - each at level 9 of the system.

It was not until 2017 that clubs were relegated from the competition, into the Central Midlands League and Leicestershire Senior League.

The competition had several feeder leagues at level 11 of the pyramid:
 Central Midlands League South Division
 Leicestershire Senior League Premier Division
 Nottinghamshire Senior League Premier Division

Clubs were also liable to be transferred to other leagues if the FA deemed it geographically suitable to do so.

The East Midlands Counties League was disbanded at the end of the 2020–21 season, most of its remaining clubs were assigned to the Northern Counties East and United Counties leagues' Step 6 divisions, as part of reorganising the National League System where the United Counties League added an additional Step 5 division.

Final clubs (2020–21)

Honours

Champions

 As a result of the COVID-19 pandemic, the 2019–20 season's competition was formally abandoned on 26 March 2020, with all results from the season being expunged, and no promotion or relegation taking place to or from the competition. The next season was also abandoned on 24 February 2021 but promotion proceeded after a one-year postponement.

Promoted

 * Based on points-per-game averages obtained by adding the accumulated number of games played between 2019 and 2021, and dividing it by total number of points.
 ** As a result of the COVID-19 pandemic, the 2019–20 season's competition was formally abandoned on 26 March 2020, with all results from the season being expunged, and no promotion or relegation taking place to or from the competition.

League Cup
The league also ran the East Midlands Counties League Cup, which was contested by every club in the league.

Finals

 * Result after extra-time
 ** As a result of the COVID-19 pandemic, the 2019–20 season's competition was formally abandoned on 26 March 2020, with all results from the season being expunged.

References

 
2008 establishments in England
East Midlands
Defunct football leagues in England
Sports leagues established in 2008
Sports leagues disestablished in 2021
2021 disestablishments in England